The UAF Bristol Bay Campus (BBC)  is one of several rural campuses administered by the University of Alaska Fairbanks system. The campus is located in Dillingham, Alaska, and serves the many remote communities of Bristol Bay, Alaska Peninsula, Pribilof Islands, and the Aleutian regions of southwest Alaska. There are learning centers in Dillingham, King Salmon, Togiak, New Stuyahok, St. Paul, and Unalaska. BBC focuses on serving Alaska Native and non-traditional students by offering online, audio, and face-to-face learning opportunities. BBC believes that all students have a right to an education that provides opportunities and expands life choices relevant to the students’ cultures within their local communities.

History 
Since 1985, BBC has been serving the 33 remote Bristol Bay villages on the Alaskan mainland which are scattered over a 55,000 square mile area (the size of Ohio). In July 2015, the Campus was asked by the UAF administration to oversee higher education services in the islands of the Aleutian-Pribilof region, which was previously served through the Fairbanks-based Interior-Aleutians Campus (now renamed the UAF Interior Alaska Campus).

Mission 
BBC is committed to knowledge-based education of rural Alaskans. It affects social and economic change of the communities it serves by enriching the quality of life for students through learning.

Visionary Endeavors 
 Incorporate time-honored convention into curriculum
 Consistently offer quality academic courses, certificates, and degrees
 Deliver relevant, location-based fields of study
 Provide unwavering direction, guidance, and support

Values 
 Preparing through education
 Discovering potential
 Connecting and collaborating with partners
 Respecting culture and tradition
 Committing to lifelong learning
 Increasing individual empowerment and dedication

See also
 University of Alaska Fairbanks
 Dillingham, Alaska
 Southwest Alaska
 Bristol Bay

External links
 University of Alaska Fairbanks (UAF)
 UAF Bristol Bay Campus
 City of Dillingham
 Dillingham City School District
 UAF Bristol Bay Environmental Science Lab

Buildings and structures in Dillingham Census Area, Alaska
Education in Unorganized Borough, Alaska
University of Alaska System